Frommeella (Frommeëlla) is a genus of rust fungi in the family Phragmidiaceae. The widespread genus contains two species.

The genus name of Frommeella is in honour of Fred Denton Fromme (1886 - 1966), who was an American botanist (Mycology) and Professor of Botany at 
Virginia Polytechnic Institute.

The genus was circumscribed by George Baker Cummins and Yasuyuki Hiratsuka in Ill. Gen. Rust Fungi, rev. ed., Vol.120 on page 151 in 1983.

References

External links

Pucciniales
Basidiomycota genera